Mana Ohyama (大山 真奈, Ōyama Mana; born 7 December 1992) is a Japanese handball player for Hokkoku Bank and the Japanese national team.

She participated at the 2017 World Women's Handball Championship.

Achievements 
Carpathian Trophy:
Bronze Medalist: 2019

Individual awards
 Carpathian Trophy Fair Play Award: 2019

References

1992 births
Living people
Japanese female handball players
Handball players at the 2018 Asian Games
Asian Games bronze medalists for Japan
Asian Games medalists in handball
Medalists at the 2018 Asian Games
Handball players at the 2020 Summer Olympics
21st-century Japanese women
20th-century Japanese women